Nifekalant (INN) is a class III antiarrhythmic agent approved in Japan for the treatment of arrhythmias and ventricular tachycardia.  It has the brand name Shinbit.

References

Antiarrhythmic agents
Pyrimidines
Nitrobenzenes
Potassium channel blockers